Lyonesse is a kingdom which, according to legend, consisted of a long strand of land stretching from Land's End at the southwestern tip of Cornwall, England, to what is now the Isles of Scilly in the Celtic Sea portion of the Atlantic Ocean. It was considered lost after being swallowed by the ocean in a single night. The people of Lyonesse allegedly lived in what is described as fair towns, with over 140 churches, and worked in fertile, low-lying plains.

Lyonesse is mentioned in Arthurian legend, but particularly in the tragic love-and-loss story of Tristan and Iseult. Lyonesse is most notable as the home of the hero Tristan (one of the Knights of the Round Table), whose father Meliodas was king of Lyonesse. After the death of Meliodas, Tristan became the heir of Lyonesse, but he was never to take up his inheritance because Lyonesse sank beneath the sea while he was away at his uncle King Mark's court in Cornwall. In later traditions, Lyonesse is said to have sunk beneath the waves in a single night, yet stories differ whether this catastrophic event occurred on 11 November 1099, or 10 years earlier. According to legend, the people of Lyonesse allegedly had committed a crime so terrible that God took his revenge against them and their kingdom. The crime is never mentioned in any text or stories, but the legend tells of a horrific storm that occurred over the course of a single night, which resulted in an enormous wave that swallowed the kingdom and everything that was in its path. In what may have been a tsunami or tidal wave, the Kingdom of Lyonesse was lost forever and disappeared from the face of the earth as if it had never existed.

The sole survivor

Local Cornwall village tourism guides offer stories of a man who escaped the storm and a subsequent wave while riding a white horse. Apparently, the horse lost one of its shoes during the escape. The rider's name is thought to be Trevelyan (or Trevilian). The rider had been out hunting during the day and had fallen asleep under a tree. Trevelyan was awoken by a horrible noise and raced across the land to higher ground. This story is linked to local Cornish families who have used the image of three horseshoes as part of their family crest for generations. One family in particular goes by the name Vyvyan, and is one of Cornwall's oldest families; they also have a crest of a white horse and claim to be descendants of the sole survivor, Trevelyan. The Vyvyan family claims that Trevelyan was the last governor of the lost kingdom before Lyonesse was swallowed by the ocean.

Today, many myths and legends continue to arise about Lyonesse without physical evidence. Included among these legends are tales of local fishermen who claim that on calm days, one can still hear the bells of the many churches softly ringing in the seas off the west Cornish coast. Local fishermen also claim that they have caught glass, forks, and wood in their fishing nets.

The Lyonesse Project

A 2009–13 joint study titled The Lyonesse Project: A Study of the Coastal and Marine Environment of the Isles of Scilly was commissioned by English Heritage and carried out by the Historic Environment Projects, Cornwall Council, with a team of academics, local experts, and enthusiasts "to reconstruct the evolution of the physical environment of the Isles of Scilly during the Holocene, the progressive occupation of this changing coastal landscape by early peoples, and their response to marine inundation and changing marine resource availability." The project found that while much of the story of Lyonesse can be "dismissed as fantasy", an overflow of legends and memories of submergences is common throughout the northwestern portion of Europe. It concluded that the Isles of Scilly were once a single large island, which separated into smaller islands due to the rapid sea-level rise. Stone walls have been located under the water in the vicinity of the Isles of Scilly, which support the findings that sea level rises impacted the towns of the area, although whether they are evidence of buildings or the remains of medieval fish traps remains unclear.

Lyonesse in Arthurian legend
In medieval Arthurian legend, no references are made to the sinking of Lyonesse, because the name originally referred to a still-existing place. Lyonesse is an English alteration of French Léoneis or Léonois (earlier Loönois), a development of Lodonesia, the Latin name for Lothian in Scotland. Continental writers of Arthurian romances were often puzzled by the internal geography of Great Britain; thus it is that the author of the French Prose Tristan appears to place Léonois beside Cornwall.

In English adaptations of the French tales, Léonois, now "Lyonesse", becomes a kingdom wholly distinct from Lothian, and closely associated with the Cornish region, though its exact geographical location remained unspecified. The name was not attached to Cornish legends of lost coastal lands until the reign of Elizabeth I of England. However, the legendary lost land between Land's End and Scilly has a distinct Cornish name: Lethowsow. The name means 'the milky ones', from the constant white water surrounding the reef.

Alfred, Lord Tennyson's Arthurian epic Idylls of the King describes Lyonesse as the site of the final battle between King Arthur and Mordred (King Arthur's nephew and illegitimate son). One passage in particular references legends of Lyonesse and its rise from (and subsequent return to) the ocean:

Then rose the King and moved his host by night
And ever pushed Sir Mordred, league by league,
Back to the sunset bound of Lyonesse—
A land of old upheaven from the abyss
By fire, to sink into the abyss again;
Where fragments of forgotten peoples dwelt,
And the long mountains ended in a coast
Of ever-shifting sand, and far away
The phantom circle of a moaning sea.

Analogues in Celtic mythology
The legend of a sunken kingdom appears in Cornish, Breton and Welsh mythologies. In Christian times, it came to be viewed as a sort of Cornish Sodom and Gomorrah, an example of divine wrath provoked by unvirtuous living. A Breton parallel is found in the tale of the Cité d'Ys or Ker Ys, similarly drowned as a result of its debauchery, with a single virtuous survivor, King Gradlon, escaping on a horse. Acoording to Welsh legend, the kingdom of Cantre'r Gwaelod in Cardigan Bay was drowned due to the drunkard negligence of its prince, Seithenyn, who allowed the sea to sweep through the floodgates.

The tale of Lyonesse is sometimes suggested to represent an extraordinary survival of folk memory of the flooding of the Isles of Scilly and Mount's Bay near Penzance  when the sea levels rose during the Bronze Age. For example, the Cornish name of St Michael's Mount is Karrek Loos y'n Koos – literally "the grey rock in the wood", suggesting that the bay was once a forest. According to local tourism guides in the region, Lyonesse was once connected to the west of Cornwall and is firmly rooted in Cornwall's traditions and mythology. Cornish people around Penzance still get occasional glimpses at extreme low water of a sunken forest in Mount's Bay, where petrified tree stumps become visible adjacent to the Celtic Sea. John of Worcester, a famous English monk and chronicler, wrote in 1099 that St Michael's Mount (now an island in Mount's Bay) was five or six miles from the sea, enclosed in a thick wood. The importance of the maintenance of this memory can be seen in that it came to be associated with the legendary Brython hero Arthur, although the date of its inundation is actually c. 2500 BC.

Notable cultural references

In fiction 
 Dawn in Lyonesse is a 1938 short novel by Mary Ellen Chase.
  The Lyonesse Trilogy is a group of three novels by Jack Vance.
 Lyonesse: The Well Between the Worlds (2009) and Lyonesse: Dark Solstice (2010) are two children's books by Sam Llewellyn.
 The manga and anime series The Seven Deadly Sins is set in the kingdom of Liones.
In the 1995 film First Knight, before her marriage to King Arthur, Guinevere rules as "Lady of Lyonesse".

In poetry 
Tristram of Lyonesse (1882) is an epic poem by Algernon Charles Swinburne.
 When I Set out for Lyonnesse (1914) is by Thomas Hardy.  An edition published in 1932 adds the year 1870 to the title, a reference to Hardy's trip to St Juliot, where he met his first wife Emma Gifford. The poem said Lyonnesse is "a hundred miles away"; the straight-line distance from St Juliot to Dorchester is 97 miles.
 Sunk Lyonesse (1922), by Walter de la Mare
 Lyonnesse (1962), by Sylvia Plath
 Lyonnesse (2021), by Penelope Shuttle

In music 
 "Lyonesse", a song by Cornish folk composer Richard Gendall, appears as the title track of the 1982 album by Brenda Wootton.
 "When I Set out for Lyonnesse" is a setting of Hardy's poem by English composer Gerald Finzi in his 1936 song cycle Earth and Air and Rain
"The Bells of Lyonesse", a song by German progressive metal band Subsignal, appears on their 2018 album La Muerta.

In transport 
 SS Lyonesse is a steam ferry of the West Cornwall Steam Ship Company.
 Lyonesse: Great Western Railway Bulldog class steam locomotive no. 3361
 Lyonnesse: Southern Railway King Arthur class steam locomotive no. 743
 Lyonnesse: British Railways standard class 5 steam locomotive no. 73113.

See also

Listeneise
 Cornish culture
 Gallia Lugdunensis
 Matter of Britain
 Edith Olivier
 Where Troy Once Stood

References

Further reading
 Eilhart von Oberge (circa 1180) Tristant
 Anonymous (circa 1220) Prose Tristan
 Anonymous (circa 1335) La Tavola Ritonda
 Malory, Sir Thomas (1470) Le Morte D'Arthur
 Anonymous (1555) I Due Tristani
 Tennyson, Alfred Lord (1886) Idylls of the King
 Lyonesse. (2019, January 15). Retrieved November 25, 2020, from https://kingarthursknights.com/lyonesse/ 
 Coate, M. (2009, February 12). The Vyvyan Family of Trelowarren: Transactions of the Royal Historical Society. Retrieved November 25, 2020, from https://www.cambridge.org/core/journals/transactions-of-the-royal-historical-society/article/vyvyan-family-of-trelowarren/E9C2A865420F1C076A36038681EE757C 
 Trejo, A. (2020, July 24). Discover The Legends of the Lost Kingdom of Lyonesse. Retrieved November 17, 2020, from https://elementsintime.com/myths/lyonesse-kingdom/
 Lyonesse. (2018, July 20). Retrieved November 17, 2020, from http://www.cornwalls.co.uk/myths-legends/lyonnesse.htm
 Mrreese. (2014, December 23). The Lost Land of Lyonesse – Legendary City on the Bottom of the Sea.

Locations associated with Arthurian legend
Cornish folklore
Locations in Celtic mythology
Mythological populated places
Fictional European countries
Flood myths
History of the Isles of Scilly